Gisela Dulko and Flavia Pennetta were the defending champions, but Dulko chose not to participate that year..

Pennetta partnering Roberta Vinci lost in the final.

Seeds

Draw

Draw

External links
Main Draw and Qualifying Draw

2007 Copa Colsanitas Singles
Copa Colsanitas Singles